COQ5 may refer to:

 Coenzyme Q5, a chemical compound
 Coenzyme Q5, methyltransferase, an enzyme